Reidel Clarence Anthony (born October 20, 1976) is a former American football wide receiver who played in the National Football League (NFL) from 1997 to 2001. Anthony played college football for the University of Florida, and received consensus All-American honors. He was a first-round pick in the 1997 NFL Draft, and played professionally for the Tampa Bay Buccaneers of the NFL.

Early years
Anthony was born in Pahokee, Florida, in 1976.  He attended Glades Central High School in Belle Glade, Florida, and he was a stand-out high school football player for the Glades Central Raiders.  He is the son of former South Bay, Florida mayor Clarence E. Anthony.

College career
Anthony accepted an athletic scholarship to attend the University of Florida in Gainesville, Florida, where he was a wide receiver and a key target in head coach Steve Spurrier's Florida Gators football team from 1994 to 1996.  Anthony showed his stuff as a freshman in Spurrier's "fun 'n' gun" offense in 1994, when he caught an 87-yard touchdown pass from Gators quarterback Eric Kresser against the Southern Mississippi Golden Eagles.  As a junior in 1996, he played an instrumental role in the Gators' 12–1 national championship season, catching seventy-two passes to lead the Southeastern Conference (SEC) with 1,293 yards (an average of 18.0 yards per reception), and setting the SEC regular season record with eighteen touchdown catches.  Both Anthony and his fellow Gator wideout, Ike Hilliard, were first-team All-SEC selections and earned consensus first-team All-American honors.  During his three college seasons, the Gators won three consecutive SEC Championship Games in 1994, 1995, and 1996.

In the aftermath of his All-American junior season and the Gators' Bowl Alliance national championship victory over the Florida State Seminoles in the Sugar Bowl, Anthony decided to forgo his final season of NCAA eligibility and enter the NFL Draft.  He finished his college career with 126 receptions for 2,274 yards and twenty-six touchdowns (a career average of 18.0 yards per reception).  His eighteen receiving touchdowns in 1996 remains the Gators' team record and was the SEC record until it was surpassed by Ja'Marr Chase and DeVonta Smith in 2019 and 2020 respectively. The scores are tied for third with Justin Jefferson.

In a 2006 series written for The Gainesville Sun, Anthony was recognized as No. 17 among the 100 all-time greatest Gators of the first 100 years of Florida football.  He was inducted into the University of Florida Athletic Hall of Fame as a "Gator Great" in 2009.

Professional career

In , Anthony recorded thirty-five receptions for 448 yards and four touchdowns. In his fourth game, Anthony became (and still remains) the second youngest NFL player ever to record a touchdown reception (20 years, 336 days). In , he set career highs with fifty-one receptions for 708 yards and seven touchdowns. In perhaps his finest game as a Buccaneer, Anthony recorded 126 receiving yards with two touchdowns against the Jacksonville Jaguars on November 15, 1998. During the year, he also finished eighth in the NFL in all-purpose yards, totaling 1,869 yards. In , Anthony had thirty receptions for 296 yards, and scored one touchdown. In , Anthony had fifteen receptions for 232 yards and four touchdowns.

Anthony finished his five-year NFL career with 144 receptions for 1,846 yards and sixteen touchdowns.

NFL statistics
Receiving Stats

Kickoff Return Stats

Life after the NFL
Anthony currently is the offensive coordinator at his alma mater, Glades Central High School in Belle Glade, Florida.  He was formerly the receivers coach for the Celtics football team of Trinity Catholic High School in Ocala, Florida.  He is also a contributing writer to the ESPN-affiliated fan site GatorCountry.com as its official offensive analyst.

See also

 1996 College Football All-America Team
 Florida Gators football, 1990–99
 History of the Tampa Bay Buccaneers
 List of Florida Gators football All-Americans
 List of Florida Gators in the NFL Draft
 List of NCAA major college football yearly receiving leaders
 List of Tampa Bay Buccaneers first-round draft picks
 List of University of Florida Athletic Hall of Fame members

References

Bibliography
 Carlson, Norm, University of Florida Football Vault: The History of the Florida Gators, Whitman Publishing, LLC, Atlanta, Georgia (2007).  .
 Golenbock, Peter, Go Gators!  An Oral History of Florida's Pursuit of Gridiron Glory, Legends Publishing, LLC, St. Petersburg, Florida (2002).  .
 Hairston, Jack, Tales from the Gator Swamp: A Collection of the Greatest Gator Stories Ever Told, Sports Publishing, LLC, Champaign, Illinois (2002).  .
 McCarthy, Kevin M.,  Fightin' Gators: A History of University of Florida Football, Arcadia Publishing, Mount Pleasant, South Carolina (2000).  .
 Nash, Noel, ed., The Gainesville Sun Presents The Greatest Moments in Florida Gators Football, Sports Publishing, Inc., Champaign, Illinois (1998).  .

1976 births
Living people
People from Pahokee, Florida
Sportspeople from the Miami metropolitan area
Players of American football from Florida
American football wide receivers
Florida Gators football players
All-American college football players
Tampa Bay Buccaneers players
Coaches of American football from Florida
High school football coaches in Florida